The European Institute for Gender Equality (EIGE) is a European Union-initiated body dedicated exclusively to gender equality. In accordance to Regulation (EC) the institute was founded on 20 December 2006. The staff of the institute was recruited in 2007 at the European coordinating body in Vilnius. Since the beginning, the institution has difficulties to balance the democratic deficit, in the context of the issue of equality between women and men. From the very beginning equality is one of the principles of the EU. Nevertheless, there is an existing gender gap in the levels of participation, payment and benefits of women in comparison to men in the EU.

Tasks
The task of EIGE is to collect, analyze and spread data on the equality between women and men. The provision of facts ensures that gender equality is promoted. They rather help institutions and Member States of the European Union (EU) to realize the equality and to combat gender-based discrimination as sexism, disadvantage and the past-in-present-discrimination. The institution takes account of the national tasks and policy areas as well as the European ones through the principle of gender mainstreaming. The work helps and aims at equalizing men and women in all spheres of life. The collection of representative data is intended to reduce the gender gap and balance gender inequality. EIGE has become a European knowledge center for gender equality through its many resources and research results.

Organization Structures
EIGE is an institution of the European Union. The pursuit of tasks and objectives, which are delegated by the European Council and the European Parliament, are achieved through framework strategies and initiatives. The management of the institution is taken over by the board of directors. It consists of 18 representatives of the Member States as well as a representative of the European Commission. In addition to the board of directors, there is the Expert Advisory Council, which supports EIGE as an advisory body. One instrument of the institution is the involvement of candidate countries and Member States. Furthermore social partners, civil society organizations and the European Commission are involved as well as the Parliament. The provided information and the high level of expertise enable the European Union together with the European Commission and Member States to implement and manage informed policy-making.

Gender Equality Index
The Gender Equality Index is an instrument developed by EIGE and used for the first time in 2013. This index simplifies the measurement of gender equality in the Member States. A concept of different theoretical approaches with important questions to gender equality  provides the framework. The questions are treated in the core domains. The country comparison is calculated by the individual values of the Member States and six core domains of the index. The gender indicators are summed up according to the framework concept, so that at the end a cumulative summary measure is created. The central "core domains are Power, Time, Knowledge, Health, Money and Work" and since the third edition of the publication of the index it has also an intersectional approach. The satellite domains are a measure of phenomena that occur only in one specific population group. They concern, in particular, the intersectional inequality and violence. The total sum range is between 1 and 100 points. The value one represents total inequality, while 100 represents total equality. This can be used to determine the individual value for each Member State as well as the European average. The index ensures that the complexity of the topic can be interpretable and simplified.

The Gender Equality Index 2017 and the Member States in comparison 
The index score in the EU-average is 66.2 points out of 100 at the last publication in 2015 which represents an improvement of 1.2 points compared to the reference year 2012. Sweden is the front runner with 82.5 points, the last is Greece with 50.00 out of 100 points. Spain is just above the average with 68.3 points compared to Germany, which is just below the average with 65.5 points. The most gender-equal societies consistency are Sweden and Denmark. Whereas, Italy and Cyprus show the best improvement over the decade. The improvement of a balanced decision-making of women and men was the main driver of progress in nearly all EU-Member States. Throughout the last 10 years, the following three Member States did not record any improvement: the United Kingdom, Czech Republic and Slovakia.

In the core domains power, knowledge and money has been a positive development compared to the reference year in 2012. Of all domains, "power“ is still the lowest-performing domain with only 48.5 points out of 100. The domain "time" has a negative development, the value is 65.7 points. That means that the inequality in this domain has grown between women and men. The score is lower than in 2005.

The index shows that "the EU still has a lot of room for improv[ing] [...] equality between men and women".

Activities and Highlights

EIGE publications 
Reliable and comparable data are a precondition for data collection. At the same time, different methods and definitions, such as the term "violence“, make reliable data collection more difficult. Country-specific recommendations launched by EIGE solve this problem allowing for improved data collection and reporting.

This will help:
 to develop and understand issues about gender equality;
 to grasp the full scope of specific issues, so that suggestions for improvement can occur.

This enables EIGE:
 to understand the consequences, to set comparisons and demonstrate evaluations as well as formulations of trend-setting recommendations and effective measures in publications;
 to monitor, control and improve the response of certain situations from the justice and police is also made possible.

The publications of EIGE can help politicians to support their policy-making. Thus will allow progress in gender equality policies to be achieved. Examples of publications are under the topic "Cyber violence: a very real threat" the report "Cyber violence against women and girls" and under the further topic "Female genital mutilation: a problem for the EU" the report "Estimation of girls at risk of female genital mutilation in the European Union".

Beijing Platform for Action 
The Beijing Platform of Action is a commitment at the United Nations level entered by the EU, which was adopted at the Fourth World Conference on Women in 1995. This commitment serves the empowerment of women. Overall this affect 12 areas in which the engagement is supported. EIGE supports the Member States and the EU to observe the international commitment. The process is as follows: once in a year the present Presidency of the Council of the EU may select one of the 12 areas and initiates a closer examination. The collection of data by EIGE provides a sound base for political recommendations.

See also
Gender equality
Gender Equality Index
Gender inequality

References

External links

Regulation (EC) No 1922/2006 of the European Parliament and of the Council of 20 December 2006 on establishing a European Institute for Gender Equality
European Commission > Employment, Social Affairs & Equal Opportunities > Gender Equality > European Institute for Gender Equality
Equality Index
Beijing Platform for Action

Agencies of the European Union
Gender equality
2006 establishments in Lithuania
2006 in the European Union
Government agencies established in 2006
Organizations based in Vilnius
Gender studies organizations